The Pushkar Lodge is a 2019 Indian Hindi-language crime thriller film, that deals with the problem of drugs and child-trafficking in India, directed by Vijay Suthar and produced by Inder Kumar Suthar. The film stars Preeti Jhangiani with Pradeep Kabra, Gulshan Pandey and Rituraj Mohanty in supporting roles. Disco king Bappi Lahiri lauds the Trailer of film and it received positive reviews. The film released on 15 March 2019.

Plot
The pushkar lodge is story of a lost child who want to go home back but he forgot everything , a girl tourist comes from mumbai and try to get reach him home but she also get stuck with some powerful drug suppliers.

Soundtrack
There is 5 music tracks in movie composed by DJ Bharali & written by Vijay Suthar, release on Zee Music Company

Cast
 Preeti Jhangiani - Papal
 Anil Chahar - Paagal
 Pradeep Kabra - Bhaagchand
 Vijay Suthar
 Gulshan Pandey - Iqbaal Bhai
 Sachin Choudhary - Young Paagal
 Rituraj Mohanty - Band Singer
 Raghav Tiwari

References

External links

2019 films
Indian crime thriller films
2010s Hindi-language films
2019 crime thriller films